The Supreme Assembly of the Republic of Tajikistan (Tajik: Маҷлиси Олии Ҷумҳурии Тоҷикистон, Russian: Высшее собрание (Маджлиси Оли) Республики Таджикистан), also known simply as the Majlisi Oli, is the parliament of Tajikistan.

Chambers
It has two chambers:
 Assembly of Representatives (Majlisi namoyandagon), the lower chamber with 63 members elected for a five-year term, 22 by proportional representation and 41 in single-seat constituencies. The previous Chairman of the Majlisi namoyandagon was Saydullo Khayrulloyev who was elected on 27 March 2000. He was succeeded by Shukurjon Zuhurov on 16 March 2010.
 National Assembly (Majlisi milli), the upper chamber with 33 members, 25 elected for a five-year term by deputies of local majlisi and 8 appointed by the president. The current Chairman of the Majlisi milli is Rustam Emomali from 17 April 2020.

The bicameral legislature was introduced in the September 1999 constitution. Prior to that, Tajikistan had a unicameral legislature called Supreme Assembly from 1995, and a unicameral Supreme Soviet before 1995.

See also
List of Chairmen of the Supreme Soviet of the Tajik Soviet Socialist Republic
Politics of Tajikistan
List of legislatures by country
List of political parties in Tajikistan

References

External links
 

Tajikistan
Government of Tajikistan
Tajikistan
Tajikistan
1999 establishments in Tajikistan